Seveners United FC is a Vanuatu football team based in Port Vila.

References

Football clubs in Vanuatu
Port Vila